Regina Kulikova was the defending champion, but chose not to participate that year.

Sania Mirza won in the final, defeating Bojana Jovanovski 4-6, 6-3, 6-0.

Seeds

  Julia Görges (quarterfinals)
  Anastasija Sevastova (quarterfinals)
  Sybille Bammer (second round)
  Anabel Medina Garrigues (semifinals)
  Bojana Jovanovski (final)
  Ksenia Pervak (first round)
  Patricia Mayr-Achleitner (first round)
  Evgeniya Rodina (semifinals)

Draw

Finals

Top half

Bottom half

References 
 http://www.itftennis.com/procircuit/tournaments/women's-tournament/info.aspx?tournamentid=1100023127&event=

Al Habtoor Tennis Challenge - Singles
Al Habtoor Tennis Challenge
2010 in Emirati tennis